Pet Hate is a British heavy metal band who released two albums in the 1980s, titled Bad Publicity and The Bride Wore Red. Pet Hate took their name from the idea of a pet peeve.

The band was previously known as Silverwing and they had an album out in 1983 called Alive and Kicking. Several of the band members later formed a group called Wild Ones and in this guise they released an album in 1991 called Writing on the Wall.

The band hailed from Macclesfield and featured three ex Silverwing members Dave Roberts, Steve Roberts and Alistair Terry. After debuting The Bride Wore Red in 1984, renowned producer Eddie Leonetti was persuaded to produce the follow up Bad Publicity. Leonetti had produced albums from the American band Angel in the late 1970s, including one titled Bad Publicity whose artwork was rejected as being too controversial by the record company and the title was changed to Sinful. Pet Hate borrowed the cover idea for their own Bad Publicity.

The band supported Hanoi Rocks on a British tour and disbanded in 1985. Alistair Terry released a solo album entitled Young at Heart in 1986. Dave and Steve Roberts later played in Belinda Carlisle's backing band for lip-synced TV appearances throughout Europe, circa her first solo hit "Heaven Is a Place on Earth" in late 1987 / early 1988.

See also
List of new wave of British heavy metal bands

British heavy metal musical groups
New Wave of British Heavy Metal musical groups